Budagaun  is a village development committee in Rolpa District in Lumbini Province of north-eastern Nepal. At the time of the 1991 Nepal census it had a population of 4,550 people living in 836 individual households.

References

Populated places in Rolpa District